Agustín María Lastagaray Toledano (born October 8, 1981) is an Argentine footballer who currently plays for El Linqueño in Torneo Argentino B. He started his professional career with Quilmes Atlético Club. In 2006, Lastargaray would be signed by Salvadoran Club C.D. FAS from a request of his former coach Julio Asad coached the team at the time.

External links
 Agustín Lastagaray at BDFA.com.ar 

1981 births
Living people
People from Trelew
Argentine people of Basque descent
Argentine footballers
Association football forwards
Quilmes Atlético Club footballers
Expatriate footballers in El Salvador
C.D. FAS footballers